Polysyncraton is a genus of tunicates belonging to the family Didemnidae.

The genus has almost cosmopolitan distribution.

Species:

Polysyncraton adelon 
Polysyncraton adenale 
Polysyncraton alinguum 
Polysyncraton amethysteum 
Polysyncraton arafurensis 
Polysyncraton arvum 
Polysyncraton asperum 
Polysyncraton aspiculatum 
Polysyncraton asterix 
Polysyncraton bilobatum 
Polysyncraton cabofriense 
Polysyncraton calculum 
Polysyncraton canetense 
Polysyncraton catillum 
Polysyncraton cerebellum 
Polysyncraton chondrilla 
Polysyncraton chuni 
Polysyncraton circulum 
Polysyncraton crassum 
Polysyncraton cuculliferum 
Polysyncraton dealbatum 
Polysyncraton dentatum 
Polysyncraton discoides 
Polysyncraton doboense 
Polysyncraton dromide 
Polysyncraton fadeevi 
Polysyncraton fistulum 
Polysyncraton flammeum 
Polysyncraton fuscum 
Polysyncraton galaxum 
Polysyncraton glaucum 
Polysyncraton globosum 
Polysyncraton gratum 
Polysyncraton haranti 
Polysyncraton hartmeyeri 
Polysyncraton horridum 
Polysyncraton infundibulum 
Polysyncraton jugosum 
Polysyncraton kashenkoi 
Polysyncraton krylatkae 
Polysyncraton lacazei 
Polysyncraton linere 
Polysyncraton lithostrotum 
Polysyncraton lodix 
Polysyncraton longitubis 
Polysyncraton louminae 
Polysyncraton luteum 
Polysyncraton magnetae 
Polysyncraton magnilarvum 
Polysyncraton marmoratum 
Polysyncraton maurizeliae 
Polysyncraton meandratum 
Polysyncraton milleporae 
Polysyncraton miniastrum 
Polysyncraton montanum 
Polysyncraton mortenseni 
Polysyncraton multiforme 
Polysyncraton multipapillae 
Polysyncraton nigropunctatum 
Polysyncraton niveum 
Polysyncraton oceanium 
Polysyncraton orbiculum 
Polysyncraton otuetue 
Polysyncraton palliolum 
Polysyncraton papyrus 
Polysyncraton paradoxum 
Polysyncraton paramushiri 
Polysyncraton pavimentum 
Polysyncraton pedunculatum 
Polysyncraton peristroma 
Polysyncraton polysystema 
Polysyncraton pontoniae 
Polysyncraton poro 
Polysyncraton pseudomagnetae 
Polysyncraton pseudorugosum 
Polysyncraton pulchrum 
Polysyncraton purou 
Polysyncraton recurvatum 
Polysyncraton reedi 
Polysyncraton regulum 
Polysyncraton reticulum 
Polysyncraton rica 
Polysyncraton robustum 
Polysyncraton rostrum 
Polysyncraton rubitapum 
Polysyncraton rugosum 
Polysyncraton sagamiana 
Polysyncraton scobinum 
Polysyncraton scorteum 
Polysyncraton shellensis 
Polysyncraton sideris 
Polysyncraton snelliusi 
Polysyncraton spongioides 
Polysyncraton tasmanense 
Polysyncraton tegetum 
Polysyncraton tenuicutis 
Polysyncraton textus 
Polysyncraton thallomorpha 
Polysyncraton tokiokai 
Polysyncraton trivolutum 
Polysyncraton turris 
Polysyncraton vestiens 
Polysyncraton victoriensis

References

Tunicates